Markus Eggler (born 22 January 1969 in Thun) is a retired Swiss curler from Münchenstein.

At the  event, he won a bronze medal. He then skipped the Swiss team at the World Curling Championships in 1991, 1992 and 1994. He was the world champion in 1992 when his Swiss team defeated Hammy McMillan's Scottish team in the final 6-3. Eggler won a bronze at the 1994 World Championships and a bronze at the 1993 European Curling Championships.

After 1994, Eggler would not return to international curling until 2000 when he played third for Andreas Schwaller at the European Championships. At the 2001 World Curling Championships, he played lead for Christof Schwaller and won the silver medal. At the 2001 European Championships, he won a silver playing second for Andreas Schwaller. Still playing second for Schwaller, Eggler won a bronze medal at the 2002 Winter Olympics. Eggler continues to play second for Andreas.

Eggler announced his retirement from curling in 2010.

Teammates 
2010 Vancouver Olympic Games

Ralph Stöckli, Skip

Jan Hauser, Third

Simon Strübin, Lead

Toni Müller, Alternate

2002 Salt Lake City Olympic Games

Andreas Schwaller, Skip

Christof Schwaller, Third

Damian Grichting, Lead

Marco Ramstein, Alternate

External links
 
 Video: 

Curlers at the 2002 Winter Olympics
Swiss male curlers
1969 births
Living people
World curling champions
People from Thun
Curlers at the 2010 Winter Olympics
Olympic curlers of Switzerland
Olympic bronze medalists for Switzerland
Olympic medalists in curling
Medalists at the 2010 Winter Olympics
Medalists at the 2002 Winter Olympics
Sportspeople from the canton of Bern
21st-century Swiss people